The Boston Renegades are a tackle football team in the Women's Football Alliance. Based in Boston, Massachusetts, the Renegades play their home games at Harry Della Russo Stadium in Revere, Massachusetts.

Formation
On January 5, 2015, three-time national women's tackle football champions the Boston Militia announced they were discontinuing operations. To ensure that women's football would continue in Boston, three former players secured a transfer of ownership of the team from Militia president Ernie Boch, Jr. Molly Goodwin, Mia Brickhouse, and Erin Baumgartner incorporated as Boston Women's Football, LLC, and reorganized the team under the name Boston Renegades.

Season-by-season 

|-
| colspan="6" align="center" | Boston Renegades (WFA)
|-
|2015 || 3 || 2 || 0 || 1st New England Division || Won National Conference Quarterfinal (West Michigan)Lost National Conference Semifinal (Chicago)
|-
|2016 || 5 || 3 || 0 || 3rd National Conference (Tier 1) || Won National Conference Quarterfinal (Cleveland)Won National Conference Semifinal (Chicago)Lost National Conference Final (D.C.)
|-
|2017 || 7 || 0 || 0 || 1st National Conference (Tier 1) || Won National Conference Semifinal (D.C.)Won National Conference Final (Chicago)Lost WFA National Championship (Dallas)
|-
|2018 || 6 || 2 || 0 || 3rd National Conference (Tier 1) || Won National Conference Semifinal (Pittsburgh)Won National Conference Final (D.C.)Won WFA National Championship (Los Angeles)
|-
|2019 || 8 || 0 || 0 || 1st National Conference (Tier 1) || Won National Conference Final (D.C.)Won WFA National Championship (Los Angeles)
|-
|2020 || 0 || 0 || 0 ||   || Season cancelled due to global pandemic. 
|-
|2021 || 5 || 0 || 0 || 1st National Conference (Tier 1) || Won National Conference Final (Tampa Bay)Won WFA National Championship (Minnesota) 
|-
|2022 || 6 || 0 || 0 || 1st National Conference (Tier 1) || Won National Conference Semifinal (D.C.)Won National Conference Final (Pittsburgh)Won WFA National Championship (Minnesota) 
|-
!Totals || 55 || 10 || 0
|colspan="2"|(including playoffs)

2015

Recap
The new Renegades organization turned to former Boston Militia assistant coach Don Williams to lead the team as head coach in its inaugural season. Former Militia assistant coaches Michael Muccio and Brie-El Parker stepped into the coordinator positions, and the coaching staff was rounded out with both experienced and new coaches. Notably, former players Molly Goodwin and Jennifer "Coco" Edwards joined the defensive staff as rookie coaches. During the course of the season, the team added former New England Intensity Head Coach Johnny Johnson and former New England Patriots player Patrick Pass as assistant coaches.

Geographically isolated from other teams in the Northeast Region of the Women's Football Alliance (WFA), the Renegades were alone in the New England Division, and played only five scheduled regular season games instead of the customary eight. A sixth game, an interleague match with Independent Women's Football League (IWFL) team the Montreal Blitz, had been cancelled.

The Boston Renegades opened their inaugural season on April 18, 2015, with a home win against the Central Maryland Seahawks 57–0. The Renegades finished with a 3–2 regular-season record. In the WFA National Conference quarterfinals, Boston defeated the West Michigan Mayhem 59–12 at Dilboy Stadium. Then the Renegades hosted a Conference semifinal game against the Chicago Force, but lost 49–18.

Standings

Games

2016

Recap
Following a season as an assistant coach, John Johnson was appointed head coach of the Renegades. Patrick Pass stepped into the defensive coordinator and defensive backs coach positions. Former Boston Militia coach Vernon Crawford returned after a season away to serve as offensive coordinator and assistant head coach. 2015 kicking coach Cliff Ashley was promoted to Special Teams Coordinator. The Renegades added several new coaches, including former Massachusetts Mutiny and Boston Militia player Susan Burtoft.

The Renegades were assigned to the Colonial Division along with the D.C. Divas, Keystone Assault, Philadelphia Phantomz, and Richmond Black Widows. But the deployment this season of a tiered playoff system with seeding determined solely by Massey Ratings made geographical assignments as such irrelevant. More meaningful was Boston's inclusion in the top tier of the league, known as Division I or WFA1, where they would compete with D.C., the Chicago Force, Pittsburgh Passion, Atlanta Phoenix, and Cleveland Fusion on the conference level. The proximity of the Philadelphia Phantomz, however, enabled the Renegades to play a customary eight-game schedule by adding home and away dates with the new Division II team.

With a 51–32 victory over Pittsburgh on May 17, Renegades quarterback Allison Cahill reached a new milestone in sports by becoming the first quarterback to attain 100 victories playing exclusively in women's football leagues.

The Renegades finished with a 5–3 regular-season record, and claimed the third seed in the WFA National Conference playoff bracket. In the conference quarterfinals, Boston defeated the Cleveland Fusion 19–13 at Dilboy Stadium. The Renegades traveled for their conference semifinal match, upsetting the Chicago Force 17–13. Boston was unable to overcome the D.C. Divas in the conference final.

Standings

Games

2017

Recap
John Johnson continued to lead the Renegades as head coach while also taking over defensive coordinator responsibilities. Vernon Crawford and Cliff Ashley continued in their established roles as offensive coordinator and special teams coordinator, respectively. The Renegades changed their venue to James R. O'Connor Stadium at Catholic Memorial School in Boston.

Boston continued to compete in the highest tier of the league, WFA1. Like 2016, the Renegades were assigned to the nominal "Colonial Division" in the Northeast Region of the National Conference. An influx of new teams to the region added new competition in Boston's schedule from the Montreal Blitz who joined the WFA from the IWFL.

Four players — Steph Jeffers, Vicky Eddy, Adrienne Smith, and Rese Woodfine — were named to the U.S. Women's National Football Team. Jeffers and Eddy, along with former player Emily Weinberg, played in the 2017 IFAF Women's World Championship tournament in Canada, and won the gold medal.

The Renegades finished the regular season undefeated with a 7–0 record, and claimed the top seed in the WFA National Conference playoff bracket, securing home field advantage. Following a bye in the quarterfinals, Boston defeated the D.C. Divas 27–24 in the conference semifinal. The Renegades then defeated the visiting Chicago Force 47–33 in the conference title game. The final score of the 2017 WFA National Championship, named The W Bowl II, was Dallas Elite 31, Boston Renegades 21.

Standings

Games

2018

Recap
John Johnson continued to lead the Renegades as head coach and defensive coordinator. Vernon Crawford and Cliff Ashley also continued in their established roles respectively as assistant head coach/offensive coordinator and special teams coordinator. The Renegades changed their venue to Harry Della Russo Stadium in Revere, Massachusetts.

Boston continued to compete in the highest tier of the league, WFA1. The Renegades competed in the Northeast Region of the National Conference with the D.C. Divas and the Pittsburgh Passion. The 2018 schedule included the Philadelphia Phantomz, the New York Sharks and the Baltimore Nighthawks. Boston had not faced the Sharks since 2013 or the Nighthawks since 2009.

The Renegades finished the regular season with a 6–2 record, and claimed the #3 seed in the WFA National Conference playoff bracket. Boston upset the #2 ranked Pittsburgh Passion 63–26 in the conference semifinal, and the #1 ranked D.C. Divas 34–32 in the conference title game. Boston defeated the Los Angeles Warriors in the league championship game 42–18 at Fifth Third Bank Stadium, Kennesaw State University in Kennesaw, Georgia. The Renegades became the first team since 2006 (Atlanta Xplosion, IWFL) to capture a Division I national title by winning three consecutive games away from home. They also became the first team since 2007 (So Cal Scorpions, WPFL) to win a Division I national title despite having two losses on their season record.

Standings

Games

2019

Recap
John Johnson, Vernon Crawford, and Cliff Ashley continued in their established roles respectively as head coach/defensive coordinator, assistant head coach/offensive coordinator, and special teams coordinator.

Boston continued to compete in the highest tier of the league, WFA1. The Renegades competed in the Northeast Region of the National Conference with the D.C. Divas, and the 2019 schedule included the Baltimore Nighthawks, Philadelphia Phantomz, New York Wolves, and the Tampa Bay Inferno.

The Renegades finished the regular season with a 8–0 record, claiming the #1 seed in the WFA National Conference playoff bracket. Boston drubbed their rival the D.C. Divas 66–20 in the conference title game, then went on to defeat the Cali War, capturing their second consecutive national title. The National Championship game was held on July 13 at the Colorado School of Mines in Golden, Colorado.

Standings

Games

2020

Recap
The 2020 season of the Women's Football Alliance was cancelled in its entirety due to health and safety concerns in regards to the COVID-19 (Coronavirus) pandemic. Although regular season games were scheduled, none were played. The Renegades were able to participate in a preseason practice and scrimmage with the Baltimore Nighthawks before social distancing practices were adopted nationally to combat the spread of COVID-19.

On July 1, a film documenting the 2018 season of the Boston Renegades, "Born To Play" was aired nationally on ESPN. It was aired internationally on ABC Network on July 18. The film, directed by Viridiana Lieberman and produced by Park Pictures, received widespread critical acclaim.

Games

2021

Recap
After the 2020 season was cancelled due to a global pandemic, the Women's Football Alliance returned to play in 2021 with a shortened season. The Renegades played a five game regular season instead of the customary eight. Boston finished the regular season undefeated. They defeated the Tampa Bay Inferno in the conference championship and then won the national championship game 42–26 over the Minnesota Vixen. By doing so, the Renegades became the first team in WFA history to complete a "threepeat," which is winning a championship three years in a row. Quarterback Allison Cahill was named the game's Most Valuable Player. Cahill's autographed game jersey and a game ball signed by the team were curated by the Pro Football Hall of Fame.

Cahill was also named the National Conference Most Valuable Player of the Year for the fourth time in her career. She became the first Quarterback lead a women's tackle football team to 6 national titles (2010, 2011, 2014, 2018, 2019, 2021), surpassing the mark of five set by Kim Grodus of the Detroit Demolition (2002, 2003, 2004, 2005, 2007). Defensive End Danielle Fournier was named National Conference Defensive Player of the Year.

The Renegades were surprised by NFL team owner Robert Kraft who offered to have the team flown to the WFA National Championship Game aboard the New England Patriots team plane. The event went viral on social media, providing exposure and publicity to the team and the sport of women's tackle football.

"Born To Play," a film documenting the 2018 season of the Boston Renegades, was made widely available through video-on-demand platforms including Hulu, Apple TV, VUDU, and Netflix.

Standings

Games

2022

Recap
The Renegades played a six game regular season, finishing the regular season undefeated. Over the course of the regular season, Boston celebrated its milestone 50th franchise victory and wide receiver Adrienne Smith became the WFA's all-time receiving yards leader. Quarterback Allison Cahill was named the WFA National Conference Most Valuable Player for the 2022 season.

In the postseason, Boston defeated the D.C. Divas in the National Conference semifinal, the Pittsburgh Passion in the National Conference championship, and then won the national championship game 32–12 over the Minnesota Vixen. By doing so, the Renegades became the first team in WFA history to complete a "fourpeat," winning a championship an unprecedented four years in a row. Chanté Bonds was named the MVP of the championship game which was televised on ESPN2.

Standings

Games

References

External links
Boston Renegades official website
WFA official website

Women's Football Alliance teams
Revere, Massachusetts
American football teams in Massachusetts
American football teams established in 2015
2015 establishments in Massachusetts
Sports in Suffolk County, Massachusetts
Women in Boston